Matthew Walton (died January 18, 1819) was a U.S. Representative from Kentucky, cousin of George Walton and John Walton.

Walton received a limited schooling.
He served as member of the conventions held in Danville in 1785 and 1787.
He served as member of the first State constitutional convention, 1792.
He served as member of the Kentucky House of Representatives, 1792, 1795, and 1808.

Walton was elected as a Democratic-Republican to the Eighth and Ninth Congresses (March 4, 1803 – March 3, 1807).
He died in Springfield, Kentucky on January 18, 1819. He was interred in Springfield Cemetery.

References

1819 deaths
Year of birth unknown
Democratic-Republican Party members of the United States House of Representatives from Kentucky
Members of the Kentucky House of Representatives